Modern Toss is a British comic by Jon Link and Mick Bunnage. Renowned for their scurrilous humour and highly stylised animation, it was created in 2004, initially as a website publishing single panel jokes and then as series of irregularly released comics. To date there have been ten issues, with the early ones now highly collectable (especially the second, with its free sample of royal hair). The first four comics were republished as two books by Macmillan and two TV series were produced for Channel 4 and distributed worldwide by Fremantle Media.

Prior to starting Modern Toss, Link and Bunnage were on the original launch team for Loaded magazine, where they developed their first joint cartoon strip, Office Pest.

Comics and books
Since 2004, eight issues of Modern Toss have been published as comics, plus one Christmas Special in 2007. Only Issues 5 to 8 are still in print and some of the early editions are now highly collectable.

The early editions of the comics were part funded by advance subscriptions of enthusiasts who discovered Modern Toss cartoons on the web and eventually became the 'Friends of Modern Toss' – always credited on the final page of each of the comics.

The first two issues of the comic were compiled into a book, Modern Toss, published by Macmillan in 2004 (now out of print) and Simon & Schuster in the US (2006). Modern Toss: Another Book was compiled from comic issues three and four and was also published by Macmillan  in 2007. Macmillan went on to publish three further books: The Modern Toss Guide to Work (2007), Modern Toss Christmas Special (2008) which is now out of print and [https://web.archive.org/web/20130617234104/http://www.moderntoss.com/books/homeclubber-book Home-Clubber – 'All You Can Eat] (2009) drawn from the long running strip in the Guardian Guide; Home-Clubber is also out of print.

Alongside publishing the comics Modern Toss have self-published three books – Collected Thoughts by Drive-By Abuser (2009), a hand-stitched collection of comic verse from their character famed for his half-baked musings; More Work (2010) a compilation of the Work cartoons produced subsequent to the release of The Modern Toss Guide to Work ; and Desperate Business (2012), which drew on the long-running series of strips in the satirical publication Private Eye.

In 2013 a souvenir book version of the F**KYEUX Tapestry was published ; an historic cartoon snapshot that was created in six hours on 28 April 2013 at Pick Me Up in Somerset House, London by Modern Toss and some people who turned up on the day. It was scribed onto one continuous roll of paper and measures 103 metres.

Television

Channel 4 commissioned Modern Toss to produce a half-hour Comedy Lab entitled Modern Toss. A live action and animation treatment which was first broadcast in May 2005 and most recently repeated in Channel 4’s Funny Fortnight in August 2012. A co-production between Modern Toss Productions and Channel X, the 30 minute show was written by Jon Link and Mick Bunnage. Live action was directed by Joe Cornish and animation by Jon Link and Mick Bunnage. The director of photography was Ben Wheatley.

Channel 4 subsequently commissioned two six part series, the first which was broadcast from 11 July 2006 and the second from 23 January 2008 4OD info. It includes live action, animation, and cartoons combining the two. The show has a voice cast that includes Mackenzie Crook, Doon Mackichan, Paul Kaye, Ralph Brown and Simon Greenall.

The live-action sketches ("I live 'ere", "Alan", "Drive by abuser", "Customer services", "Accident and emergency", "Citizens advice", "Illegal alphabet") were directed by Ben Wheatley. The animation was designed and directed by Bunnage and Link. Series one animation was produced by 12Foot6 and series two by Spy Pictures and Le Singe Media of Brighton, UK.

Alongside Channel 4 on 4 May 2007 the show aired on pay TV channel Bravo in the UK as part of the adult swim block. Between 2008 and 2010 Series 2 aired on the pay TV channel Paramount Comedy Channel (subsequently rebranded as Comedy Central). In 2010–11 the show aired on 4 Music. The first series was released on Region 2 DVD in November 2007, while a second series started on Channel 4 on 23 January 2008. The Region 2 DVD of the second series was released in spring 2008. The TV series won unanimous critical praise and were nominated for a Rose D'Or award in 2009. The two series were distributed worldwide and broadcast in 30-plus territories including the US.

Following the TV series Modern Toss produced an animated sitcom Work Experience  which was broadcast on E4 in 2008. In 2009 BBC commissioned Chaos Laboratories, a live action, sci-fi themed animation series (with Paul Kaye and Simon Day).

Channel 4 then commissioned Modern Toss to produce the Business Mouse cartoon series  for their Comedy Blaps series and ended up broadcasting them on Channel 4 in August 2012. Business Mouse picked up a Royal Television Society Award. Modern Toss also produced Robin of Essex for Channel 4  which debuted in 2012 online.

In 2012 Channel 4 commissioned Modern Toss to produce a series of five promos for their Funny Fortnight in August 2012.

Recurring cartoons
Though some of them are one-off, most of the cartoons follow recurring themes (or in a few cases loosely sequential stories). The following all appear in the publications and many also in the television series:

 Mr Tourette: a French sign-writer who produces offensive signs bearing no relation to his customers' instructions. This usually culminates in his customer being totally unhappy with the work and Mr Tourette calling them "some kind of cunt"
 Alan: a sociopathic, scribble-like creature who plays extreme practical jokes on his middle-class brother-in-law, usually involving Alan turning up uninvited to a social event and causing a large amount of destruction, to the tune of "I Like To Move It" by Reel 2 Real, before running away, leaving his brother-in-law to shout "Come back, Alan, you wanker!"
 Prince Edward, Royal Entrepreneur: the prince tries to make money out of anything associated with the royal family, no matter how tasteless
 Cheese and Wine: satire of boring 'small talk' made at parties, such as 'I hear Peter's new business is in trouble' meeting with the reply 'Peter's a cunt'
 Citizens' Advice: irate and often illogical complaints from members of the public about goods, services and employers, usually concluding with the question "where do I stand legally?"
 Work: conversations with disgruntled or complacent employees; for example, a man phones in from home, saying, "I've heard the printer's broken so I won't be coming in"
 999: emergency phone calls from people in bizarre situations
 Emergency services: people with bizarre health complaints
 Daytrippers: two men discuss plans for various violent outings
 Planet chat: everyday conversations between celestial bodies
 Space argument: astronauts arguing on the moon
 I live 'ere: a farmer who recounts his violent assaults on members of the public
 Drive-by abuser: a man on a moped who shouts pointless insults at people, animals or inanimate objects he drives past. Typical examples include:
"You're a traffic light, yeh? Changing colours, yeh? Yeh, fucking looks like it an' all"
"Well good luck to ya, 'cause I wouldn't have the fucking nerve"
"Why not, though, eh? It's your life, innit?"
"See ya around, yeah?"
 Fly talk: conversations between flies about humans they have encountered, sometimes mentioning celebrities including Chris Martin and 50 Cent.
 Home clubber: provides a panel of insight into the latest exploit of an amoral entrepreneur. These cartoons appear weekly in the "Guide" section of The Guardian
 Weekend: tedious domestic conversations
 Medieval Kneval: exploits of a medieval stuntman
 Peanut: the saga of a disbanded pop group and their manager
 Park: dog excrement related events in a park
 Dogkiller: novel methods of luring dogs to their death
 And what do you think?: vox pop interviews
 Customer Services: Customers returning purchased items to shops with absurd complaints about the item's quality, i.e.: "This CD I bought off you, made me kill someone!" Or: "This kitchen I bought off you, gave me manic depression!"

The following recurring cartoons are in the television version only:
 Gnat burglar: a giant gnat which sucks the entire contents out of things and injects it into other things
 Underground wolf gobbler: a giant semi-human monster that pops up out of the ground and eats things, bears a passing resemblance to Rupert Murdoch (Actually editor Rob Hill's father Bob)
 Peace & quiet: a man who seeks peace and quiet in his garden, but is plagued by noise from neighbours and others nearby
 Barney: a man who periodically turns into a red Incredible Hulk-like monster at the mention of Alan Titchmarsh and during everyday minor frustrations, and causes destruction in a mad rage, followed by embarrassment at what he has done
 Illegal Alphabet: a large number of human-sized letters that congregate in a field to form rude words (including bizarre portmanteaus such as "pipecock"); they are then ambushed by police. These scenes end with a BBC Radio 4-style voiceover announcing e.g. "That was Illegal Alphabet in 'unsanctioned piss meeting' followed by 'unauthorised shitcasket'"Sneezeman: a little man with a huge nose who is propelled backwards at great speed when he sneezes, usually hurting himself and destroying propertySeawalker''': this has only appeared once so far in the television series — a man with very long legs walks out of the sea onto the beach, whereupon his legs are severed by people playing frisbee

Mr Tourette and Alan appear on the covers of Modern Toss booklets and books and on merchandise.

The Periodic Table of Swearing
A creation inspired by the Periodic Table, The Periodic Table of Swearing design was featured in the 2011 book Information Graphics, which documents the history of classic presentation of information through design. Written by Sandra Rendgen and edited by Julius Wiedemann, it is effectively a survey of data visualisation, published by Taschen.

Eulogised in Eye magazine the Periodic Table of Swearing was produced as an actual, interactive table by Clay Interactive as an installation at the Latitude Festival in 2011. Released as an app the same year (see below) the Periodic Table of Swearing has also been utilised in design of a jacket for Gresham Blake, prints, T-clots, mugs and magnet sets.

Commissioned works
Bunnage and Link partnered with shoe company Kickers in 2009 to present Random Bandits, a suite of cartoons in the style of other Modern Toss productions. They have developed three strands of film theme which appear as short skits in each of the episodes that make up the Kickers presents Random Bandits series.  The films feature voiceovers by comedy actor Mackenzie Crook.

In 2011, Modern Toss were commissioned by Brighton and Hove Albion FC to produce artwork for their new stadium, the Falmer Stadium, in the West Stand of the ground.

Merchandise
There is a wide variety of Modern Toss'' merchandise, including T-shirts, soft toys, DVDs, books, comics, magnets, posters, art prints, games and beer.

"The Daily Toss: Your Daily Serving of Modern Toss" is an iPhone and iPad app developed by Modern Toss and Aimer Media. Cartoons from the Modern Toss archive are presented in a dated sequence in seasonal batches.
An earlier app The Pocket Shouter was a soundboard iPhone app featuring the Drive-by abuser. It first appeared in 2009 but as of March 2011 is no longer available. A new version is planned for Summer 2011.
The Periodic Table of Swearing android App was released in 2011 . In 2013 The Periodic Table of Swearing became available online in HTML 5 

In Autumn 2012 Modern Toss collaborated with Sensei Games  in the design of IOS game "Sneezeman:Escape From Planet Sneeze"  which has 84 levels and 7 game zones.

In June 2018, Modern Toss launched two beers ("Horse Piss" and "Ditch Scooper"), brewed by Goldmark Craft Beers of Arundel.

Tag lines

"Modern Toss - the stink of excellence in a world gone tits up!"
"Modern Toss. Watching a TV program yeah? Looks like it an' all!" both delivered by a female voiceover (Doon Mackichan)

References

External links
 Modern Toss
 
 

British comics
Adult humour titles